Hoyerswerda-Neustadt station is a railway station in the Neustadt district in the town of Hoyerswerda, located in the Bautzen district in Saxony, Germany.

References

Railway stations in Saxony
Buildings and structures in Bautzen (district)